Events from the year 1565 in India.

Events
 Tirumala Deva Raya becomes king of Vijayanagara Empire following Aliya Rama Raya's death (reigns until 1572)
 26 January – The Battle of Talikota is fought; destruction of Vijayanagar.

Births
 Muhammad Quli Qutb Shah fifth Qutb Shahi sultan of Golkonda and founder of Hyderabad is born (dies 1612)

Deaths
 Aliya Rama Raya progenitor of the Aravidu dynasty of Vijayanagara Empire

References

See also

 Timeline of Indian history